Adhala Dam, is an earthfill dam on Adhala river near Akole, Deothan, Ahmednagar district in state of Maharashtra in India.

Specifications

 Capacity in TMC: 1.02(By Abhi Thorat)

Purpose
 Irrigation in Akole, Sagamner & Sinner Tahsil
 Drinking Water supply to Devthan, Hivargaon Ambre, Ganore, Dongargaon & Pimplegaon villages (created by government)

See also
 Dams in Maharashtra
 List of reservoirs and dams in India

References

Dams in Ahmednagar district
Dams completed in 1976
Earth-filled dams
1976 establishments in Maharashtra